Chester is a census-designated place (CDP) in Chesterfield County, Virginia, United States. Per the 2020 census, the population was 23,414.

History

Chester's original "downtown" was a stop which was an intersection of the Richmond and Petersburg Railroad, running north to south, and the Clover Hill Railroad, which became the Brighthope Railway, then the Farmville and Powhatan Railroad.  In 1900, when the Richmond and Petersburg merged with the Atlantic Coast Line, that new railroad intersected the same east west railroad which became the Tidewater and Western Railroad in 1905. 
 
The Seaboard Air Line also passed through in 1900 running north to south which to day is replaced with Chester Linear Park. Chester today is a bedroom community along State Route 10. Recent commercial development in Chester has emerged at the sprawling intersection of SR 10 and U.S. Route 1 (Jefferson Davis Highway) near the on-ramp to Interstate 95. 

In April, 1781, during the American Revolution, the Osborne's Landing area of Chester was the site of the Action at Osborne's in which General Benedict Arnold destroyed much of Virginia's navy.

In May, 1864, the Chester Station was the scene of the Battle of Chester Station during the Bermuda Hundred Campaign of the American Civil War.The area was damaged by Hurricane Isabel in 2003.

Geography
Chester is located at  (37.353449, -77.435767).

Demographics

2020 census

Note: the US Census treats Hispanic/Latino as an ethnic category. This table excludes Latinos from the racial categories and assigns them to a separate category. Hispanics/Latinos can be of any race.

2000 Census
At the 2000 census, there were 17,890 people, 6,727 households and 5,119 families residing in the CDP. The population density was 531.7/km2 (1,377.1/mi2). There were 6,951 housing units at an average density of 206.6/km2 (535.1/mi2). The racial makeup of the CDP was 81.3% White, 13.4% African American, 0.4% Native American, 2.2% Asian, 0.1% Pacific Islander, 1.0% from other races, and 1.5% from two or more races. Hispanic or Latino of any race were 3.1% of the population.

There were 6,727 households, of which 40.0% had children under the age of 18 living with them, 58.2% were married couples living together, 14.0% had a female householder with no husband present, and 23.9% were non-families. 19.0% of all households were made up of individuals, and 4.7% had someone living alone who was 65 years of age or older. The average household size was 2.66 and the average family size was 3.04.

Age distribution was 28.3% under the age of 18, 7.9% from 18 to 24, 31.4% from 25 to 44, 24.2% from 45 to 64, and 8.3% who were 65 years of age or older. The median age was 35 years. For every 100 females, there were 94.9 males. For every 100 females age 18 and over, there were 92.2 males.

The median household income was $53,171, and the median family income was $60,632. Males had a median income of $44,167 versus $30,295 for females. The per capita income for the CDP was $23,258. About 6.5% of families and 8.0% of the population were below the poverty line, including 12.2% of those under age 18 and 4.0% of those age 65 or over.

Local media
Chester is served by the local newspaper The Village News, which has a circulation of approximately 12,000, and is distributed at 230 locations in the area. As a southern suburb of metro Richmond, Chester is also in the Richmond-Petersburg media market served by the Richmond Times-Dispatch.

Education
Chester is served by Chesterfield County Public Schools. Students are also able to apply to Appomattox Regional Governor's School for the Arts And Technology and Maggie L. Walker Governor's School for Government and International Studies.

Schools include Thomas Dale High School, Matoaca High School, L. C. Bird High School, Carver Middle School, Enon Elementary, Marguerite Christian Elementary, C.E. Curtis Elementary, C.C. Wells Elementary, Ecoff Elementary, Harrowgate Elementary, Elizabeth N. Scott Elementary, and Elizabeth Davis Middle School.

The city is also home to Brightpoint Community College (originally known as John Tyler Community College). During the 2020-21 school year, Brightpoint served nearly 13,000 students.

References

External links

Chesterfield County Schools
Village News
Chester Business Directory & Connections

Census-designated places in Virginia
Census-designated places in Chesterfield County, Virginia